The Telecommunications (Security) Bill  is an proposed Act of the Parliament of the United Kingdom.

The Bill builds upon and strengthens the Communications Act 2003, in particular the role of Ofcom, the United Kingdom's Office for Communication, in regards of its role in policing the security of telecommunications and telecom providers. The Bill requires the provider of a telecommunications network to ensure that they identify, prepare, and reduce the risk of security compromises.

The Bill provides the Government with "new national security powers" and introduces a "duty owed to every person who may be affected" by a security breach.

In November 2020, the Government published its "5G Supply Chain Diversity Strategy" It pledged to "introduce a new, robust security framework" for telecommunications suppliers, enhance security powers for OfCom, and place decisions on "high risk vendors" in statutory terms.

The Bill "represents a watershed moment in the development of the UK's response to cyber-security threats." though has also been called "narrowly focused".

External links
Telecommunications (Security) Bill Text of the Bill

References

Public services
United Kingdom public law
Communications in the United Kingdom
History of telecommunications in the United Kingdom